Mathijsen is a Dutch patronymic surname (Matthijs's son) equivalent to Matthews. Some variant forms are Mathijssen, Matthijs, Matthijsen, Matthijsse, Matthijssen, Matthysen and Matthysse. Notable people with the surname include:

Mathijsen
 Antonius Mathijsen (1805–1878), Dutch army surgeon
  (born 1966), Dutch science fiction author
 Joris Mathijsen (born 1980), Dutch football defender
 Marita Mathijsen (born 1944), Dutch literary historian
Mathijssen
 Danny Mathijssen (born 1983), Dutch football midfielder and manager
 Jacky Mathijssen (born 1963), Belgian football player and manager
 Matthijsse
Margriet Matthijsse (born 1977), Dutch competitive sailor
Matthysen
Elise Matthysen (born 1992), Belgian breaststroke swimmer 
Hugo Matthysen (born 1956), Belgian singer, guitarist, columnist, writer, and actor
Jan Matthysen (born 1940s), Belgian diplomat, ambassador to the United States 2009–13
Matthysse
Lucas Matthysse (1982), Argentine boxer, brother of Walter
Walter Matthysse (1978), Argentine boxer, brother of Lucas

See also
 Matthijs, given name and patronymic surname
 Matthys, patronymic surname
 Mathiesen
 Mathisen
 Matthiesen

References

Dutch-language surnames
Patronymic surnames
Surnames from given names